Wilhelm Boland (born 5 January 1950 in Wesel) is a German chemist.

Scientific career 
After his dissertation (1978) and habilitation (1986) at the University of Cologne, Boland became Associate Professor of Organic Chemistry at Karlsruhe University in 1987. He was appointed Full Professor of Bioorganic Chemistry at Bonn University in 1994. Since 1996 he is Director and Scientific Member at the Max Planck Institute for Chemical Ecology and head of the Department of Bioorganic Chemistry (Emeritus since 2018). In 1998 he was appointed Honorary Professor at the Friedrich Schiller University in Jena.

Boland studies the defensive chemistry of leaf beetles and the induction of plant defense pathways. Microbial interactions with plants and insects are further research topics in his department. He developed new methods in analytical and synthetic chemistry and investigates enzyme mechanisms and the gut chemistry of insects.

Awards and honors
 Silverstein-Simeone Lecture Award of the International Society of Chemical Ecology, 1995
 Member of the North Rhine-Westphalia Academy for Sciences and Arts (since 2002)
 Hans Herloff Inhoffen Medal of the German Research Centre for Biotechnology (GBF), 2005
 Peter Hemmerich Lecture, University of Konstanz, 2006
 President of the International Society of Chemical Ecology 2008-2009
 Silver Medal Award der International Society of Chemical Ecology 2023

Selected publications
   
  
  
  .

References

External links 
 Webpage of the Department of Bioorganic Chemistry at the Max Planck Institute for Chemical Ecology

1950 births
20th-century German chemists
Living people
Academic staff of the University of Bonn
People from Wesel
21st-century German chemists
Chemical ecologists
Max Planck Institute directors
University of Cologne alumni
Academic staff of the Karlsruhe Institute of Technology
Academic staff of the University of Cologne
Academic staff of the University of Jena